Simone Molinaro (c. 1570 – May 1636) was a composer of the late Renaissance in Italy. He was especially renowned for his lute music.

Life and career
Molinaro was born in Genoa.  He studied music with his uncle, Giovanni Battista Dalla Gostena, who was maestro di cappella at Genoa Cathedral. In 1593, Gostena was murdered, and Molinaro succeeded him in his post at the Cathedral in 1599.  The same year he published Intavolatura di liuto, containing lute works both by himself and by Gostena. In addition to his lute works, Molinaro composed a large amount of sacred choral music, most of which does not survive completely because of missing partbooks. However, some five-voice motets have been preserved in the collections of Hasler and Schadaeus. Molinaro died in May 1636 in Genoa.

Molinaro also served as editor of the works of Carlo Gesualdo, publishing editions of that composer's madrigals in 1585 and 1613.

Assessment
In his dances for lute, according to Eitner, Molinaro "despises all counterpoint, and shows himself as a pure melodist and harmonist, but both in so simple and pretty a way, that they all have something uncommonly attractive".  Molinaro wrote at the time when, according to Paul Henry Lang, lute music was reaching its apogee.  Along with Giovanni Terzi, Molinaro's lute music introduces "a finished, graceful, and sovereign instrumental style, capable of all shades of expression and of a technique which we usually associate only with the vocal music of the period".

The 1613 publication of the Gesualdo madrigals was ground-breaking because it presented Gesualdo's music in full score as opposed to partbook format.

Molinaro's music was used as the basis for "Balletto detto il Conte Orlando" of the Ancient Airs and Dances Suite No. 1 by Ottorino Respighi.

Works

Lute
 Intavolatura di liuto libro 1, Venice, 1599

Secular Vocal music
 Il 1 libro di canzonette a 3 e 4 voci, Venice, 1595
 Il 1 libro de Madrigali a 5 voci, Venice, 1599
 Il 2 libro delle Canzonette a 3 voci, Venice, 1600
  Madrigali a 5 voci, Loano 1615

Sacred Vocal music
 Motectorum quinis et Missae denis vocibus liber I, Venice, 1597
 Il 2 libro de Mottetti a 8 voci, Milan, 1601
 Il 1 libro de mottetti a 5 voci, con la partitura per sonar l'organo, Milan, 1604
 Il 1 libro de Magnificat a 4 voci, con basso continuato, Milan, 1605
 Concerti ecclesiastisi a 2 e a 4 voci...con la sua part. per l'organo, Venice, 1605
 Il 3 libro de Mottetti a 5 voci con il basso continuato, Venice, 1609
 Fatiche spirituali...libro 1 a 6 voci, Venice, 1610
 Fatiche spirituali....libro 2 a 6 voci, Venice, 1610
 Concerti a 1 e 2 voci con la part. per l'organo, Milan, 1612
 Passio Domini Iesu Christi secundum Matthaeum, Marcum, Lucam, et Ioannem, Loano, 1616

References

Bibliography
   Article "Molinaro, Simone".

External links
 
 Biography at hoasm.org
 Biography at answers.com
 

Renaissance composers
Composers for lute
Year of birth uncertain
Italian male classical composers
1634 deaths
1570s births
17th-century Italian composers
17th-century male musicians